Roman Balleza (born March 18, 1984), better known as Roman X, is a Los Angeles–based songwriter, producer, musician, and DJ. He and Dan Vikta make up the record production duo Rockystronic, producing pop, hip hop, rock and electronic music.

Career

Original songs and production 
The duo debuted in 2010 co-writing and co-producing on Christopher Von Uckermann's album Somos debuting at #5 on iTunes Latin Charts. With Christopher the team wrote/produced the songs Situación Perfecta and Imaginación and produced the song Mente Mayor written by Christopher Uckermann.
"Situación Perfecta" was mixed by 11 time Grammy award winner engineer Rafa Sardina

Current projects 
Roman X and Dan Vikta are working with singer/songwriter Ramez Iskander on his debut album.

Other projects 
Tahkus is an electropop band formed by Roman X, Dan Vikta and artist Tahkus Ekedal.

Roman currently DJs electro, progressive, dubstep and house music. He uses synthesizers, samplers, drum machines, music sequencers and controllers to create live remixes of well known songs and original material.

Studio Rockistronic 
Roman X and Dan Vikta own a recording studio based in a loft in Downtown Los Angeles.

Discography

2010 
From Christopher Von Uckermann Somos
 "Situación Perfecta"   co-written/co-produced.
 "Imaginación"          co-written/co-produced.
 "Mente Mayor"          co-produced.

2011 
Rockisrtonic's songs
 "Rebel Yell (Bootleg Remix)"
 "Wishing"
 "Separation ( with Thakus )"
 "Wobblegum I"
 "Wobblegum II"
 "Wobblegum III"
 "Wobblegum IV"
 "Wobblegum V"
 "Rockistronic DH1"
 "Rockistronic DH2"
 "Popstep I"
 "Popstep II"
 "Popstep III"

References 

1984 births
Living people
American male songwriters